Max Edwards-Stryjewski is a Welsh footballer who plays as a midfielder for Bristol Rovers.

Career
Max Edwards-Stryjewski was named in the Bristol Rovers matchday squad for the first time on 8 January 2022, coming on as a 93rd minute substitute in a 2–1 FA Cup Third Round defeat to Peterborough United. At the time of him coming on, he was Rovers' second youngest debutant ever and their youngest in the cup.

International career
In August 2019, Edwards was named in the Wales U15 squad in the 2019 UEFA tournament against Cyprus, Northern Ireland and Malta.

In August 2021, Edwards was announced to be in the Wales U17 squad for the upcoming friendly fixtures against Scotland U17s, featuring in the second fixture, a 4–3 victory.

In November 2021, Edwards was named in the Wales U17 national squad for the upcoming UEFA Euro Qualifiers held in Portugal.

References

Living people
Welsh footballers
Association football midfielders
Bristol Rovers F.C. players
Wales youth international footballers
2005 births